The 1989 Coupe de France Final was a football match played at Parc des Princes, Paris, on 10 June 1989 that saw Olympique de Marseille defeat AS Monaco FC 4–3 thanks to three goals by Jean-Pierre Papin and one by Klaus Allofs.

Match details

See also
1988–89 Coupe de France

External links
Coupe de France results at Rec.Sport.Soccer Statistics Foundation
Report on French federation site

Coupe
1989
Coupe De France Final 1989
Coupe De France Final 1989
Coupe de France Final
Coupe de France Final